Chuda may refer to the following places in Gujarat, western India :

 Chuda State, a former princely state
 a town in Surendranagar District, which was the seat of the above state

See also